The Happy Valley set was a group of hedonistic, largely  British and Anglo-Irish aristocrats and adventurers who settled in the "Happy Valley" region of the Wanjohi Valley, near the Aberdare mountain range, in colonial Kenya between the 1920s and the 1940s. In the 1930s, the group became infamous for its decadent lifestyles and exploits amid reports of drug use and sexual promiscuity.

The area around Naivasha was one of the first to be settled in Kenya by white people and was one of the main hunting grounds of the 'set'. The colonial town of Nyeri, Kenya, to the east of the Aberdare Range, was the centre of Happy Valley settlers.

In the mid-2000s, descendants of the Happy Valley set appeared again in the news, thanks to the legal troubles of Tom Cholmondeley, the great-grandson of Lord Delamere.

Some of the notable members of the Happy Valley set were: the 3rd Baron Delamere and his son and heir the 4th Baron Delamere; Denys Finch Hatton, his lover Baroness Karen von Blixen; Bror von Blixen-Finecke; Sir Jock Delves Broughton and wife Diana Delves Broughton; the 22nd Earl of Erroll; Lady Idina Sackville; Alice, Countess de Janze (cousin of J. Ogden Armour) and her husband Count Frederic de Janzé.

History
According to Ulf Aschan, "Witty, attractive, well-bred, and well read, Happy Valleyites were relentless in their pursuit to be amused, more often attaining this through drink, drugs, and sex."  
The height of the Happy Valley set's influence was in the late 1920s. The recession sparked by the 1929 Wall Street stock market crash greatly decreased the number of new arrivals to the Colony of Kenya and the influx of capital. Nevertheless, by 1939 Kenya had a white community of 21,000 people.

Location 
The area around Naivasha was one of the first to be settled by white people and one of the hunting grounds of the hedonistic Happy Valley set. The area also includes Thomson's Falls. Geoffrey Buxton, the first colonial farmer in the area, had moved up from the arid Rift Valley with its meagre rivers and a relentless dusty wind that gave Gilgil its name. And so, after finding his ideal farming country, he called this new haven 'Happy Valley'. Some members of the Happy Valley set lived in Gilgil, Kenya, just north of Lake Elementaita.

The colonial town of Nyeri in Central Province, to the east of the Aberdare Range, was the centre of Happy Valley settlers. The town had the atmosphere of a sleepy English village, an impression fostered by the cool air and morning mists. Outside Nyeri is the Outspan Hotel, a colonial landmark which became a place of pilgrimage for the world's Scouts. A small cottage on the hotel grounds was the final home of Lord Baden-Powell and his wife, founders of the Scouting movement, and he is buried outside Nyeri. The cottage has a small museum dedicated to Baden-Powell's life and memory.

In popular culture 
The antics of the Happy Valley set were highlighted in books and films such as White Mischief, which dramatised the trial of Jock Delves Broughton for the murder of Josslyn Hay, 22nd Earl of Erroll; and The Happy Valley, Juanita Carberry's account of her adolescence and later involvement with the Delves Broughton case. A biography of Idina Sackville, The Bolter, by Frances Osborne, includes stories of the origins of the Happy Valley set and features many of its key characters. Sackville was married to Lord Erroll for several years, and they had a child together.

The 1999 UK television mini-series Heat of the Sun looks at the fictional lives and crimes of Happy Valley dwellers.

Most recently, British-American author Rhys Bowen has published a murder mystery cozy titled Love and Death Among the Cheetahs taking place in the valley.

In 2019, Irish author Lucinda Riley fictionalised the lives of some well known members of the Happy Valley family in her novel of ‘The Sun Sister’.

Notables 

Although there is no actual definition of what constitutes a member of the Happy Valley set, it is generally agreed by writers that it refers to white colonials located in or around the area of the Wanjohi Valley, who were infamous during the 1920s–1940s period for a number of scandals, usually revolving around infidelity and drug/alcohol abuse.

Some of the most notable members of that clique are the following:

Hugh Cholmondeley, 3rd Baron Delamere
 
One of the first British settlers in East Africa, Hugh Cholmondeley, 3rd Baron Delamere (1870–1931), K.C.M.G., is credited with helping form the Happy Valley set. Lord Delamere first travelled to East Africa in 1891 for lion hunting and returned yearly to resume the hunt. In 1894, he was mauled by a lion. As a result, he limped for the rest of his life. He is also credited for coining the term "white hunter". In 1896, he moved to Africa and eventually settled in Kenya. Lord Delamere is also considered to have contributed significantly to the development of Kenyan agriculture. He quickly became the unofficial leader of the white community in Kenya. He was active in recruiting settlers to East Africa, and deeply admired the culture of the local Maasai. There is a story of Delamere's riding his horse into the dining room of Nairobi's Norfolk Hotel and jumping over the tables. He was also known to knock golf balls onto the roof of the Muthaiga Country Club, the pink stucco gathering-place for Nairobi's white élite, and then climb up to retrieve them. At the outbreak of World War I, Delamere was placed in charge of intelligence on the Maasai border, monitoring the movements of German units in present-day Tanzania. He married Lady Charles Markham (née Gwladys Helen Beckett) in 1928. He died in 1931.

Josslyn Hay, 22nd Earl of Erroll

A Scottish peer and notorious philanderer, Josslyn Victor Hay, 22nd Earl of Erroll (1901–1941) abandoned his diplomatic career in Great Britain and scandalised society when he eloped with a married woman, Lady Idina Sackville. The couple were married in 1923 and moved to Kenya in 1924. They became the unofficial 'king and queen' of 'Happy Valley' and their home, Slains (named after the former Hay family seat of Slains Castle), became a centre of social life, notorious for its orgies. Idina, Countess of Erroll, divorced him in 1929, because he was cheating her financially. Lord Erroll was already having an affair with married woman Molly Ramsay-Hill. The couple eloped. When Ramsay-Hill's husband found out, he hunted them down and famously horsewhipped Lord Erroll in public at Nairobi Railway Station. Erroll married Molly in 1930. In 1934, Lord Erroll joined Sir Oswald Mosley's British Union of Fascists (B.U.F.) and, on his return to Kenya a year later, became president of the Convention of Associations. Early in 1939, Erroll's wife Molly, Countess of Erroll, died from the effects of consuming a concoction of alcohol, morphine and heroin. On the outbreak of World War II later that year, Lord Erroll became a captain in the Kenya Regiment and accepted the post of military secretary for East Africa in 1940.

In late 1940, Lord Erroll met Diana, Lady Delves Broughton, the new, glamorous and much younger wife of Sir Jock Delves Broughton, 11th Baronet. Lord Erroll and Lady Delves Broughton soon became lovers. Their romance was a very public one and they intended to elope. Delves Broughton reportedly gave his blessings. However, in January 1941, Erroll was found shot dead in his car in an intersection outside Nairobi. Although Delves Broughton was charged and tried, he was acquitted of the murder. Numerous books, films (including White Mischief) and articles have been written on the murder mystery and various theories have been argued; however, the murder remains officially unsolved.

Lady Idina Sackville

A British aristocrat, daughter of the 8th Earl de la Warr and cousin of poet Vita Sackville-West, Myra Idina Sackville (1893–1955) scandalised society when she divorced her first husband Euan Wallace, losing the right to see her two sons, who were later killed while serving in World War II. Idina abandoned her second husband Captain Charles Gordon for her lover Joss Hay, the future Earl of Erroll, eight years her junior. Together, they moved to Kenya in 1924 and essentially pioneered the decadent lifestyle of the Happy Valley set. Idina became notorious for hosting wild parties, which included spouse-swapping and drug use. Stories were also told of how she often welcomed her guests in a bathtub made of green onyx and then proceeded to dress before them. After she and Erroll divorced, she married twice more. She died in 1955.

Countess Alice de Janzé

Born Alice Silverthorne (1899–1941), she was a wealthy heiress from Chicago and Buffalo, New York, daughter of an alcoholic felt manufacturer and niece to magnate J. Ogden Armour. She lived in Paris since the early 1920s, together with her husband, Count Frédéric de Janzé. The couple first met Joss Hay, Earl of Erroll and his wife, Idina, when the latter two lived in Paris in the early 1920s. After the Hays moved to the Wanjohi Valley in Kenya, they invited the de Janzés for lion hunting, in 1925 and 1926. The de Janzés lived in a house next to the Hays for several months. Alice had an affair with Lord Erroll and later with Raymond de Trafford. When the de Janzés returned to Paris, Alice abandoned her husband for Raymond.

Alice made international headlines in 1927, when she shot Raymond in a Paris railway station and then shot herself. It was later revealed she did this on account of her anguish, after Raymond told her he could not marry her. They were both hospitalised but survived; Alice was tried by a Paris court and got away with a four-dollar fine. When she returned to Kenya in 1928, she was forced by the government to leave the country as an undesirable alien. In 1932, she and Raymond married in France, but split almost immediately and later divorced. Alice later returned to the Happy Valley in Kenya. Depressive, alcoholic and addicted to morphine, she remained in Kenya until she committed suicide by shooting herself in 1941. Prior to her death, Alice had been considered as a suspect for the murder of Lord Erroll.

Count Frédéric de Janzé
A French nobleman from an old aristocratic family of Brittany, Comte (Count) Frédéric de Janzé was also famous in France for his career as a racing driver. Following an invitation from their friends, Joss and Idina Hay, he and his wife, Alice, first travelled to the Wanjohi Valley, Kenya, in 1925 and spent months there, hunting lions. Frédéric had an affair with Idina, while Alice was having an affair with Joss. Frédéric wrote a memoir, Vertical Land, in which he gives his impressions of several of the notable personalities of the Happy Valley set. He returned with Alice to Happy Valley in 1926, during which time Alice tried to elope with her new lover, Raymond de Trafford. The de Janzés divorced in 1927, in the aftermath of Alice's shooting scandal. Frédéric died in 1933, of sepsis, aged 37.

Kiki Preston

Born Alice Gwynne (1898–1946), she was an American socialite, relative of the powerful Whitney and Vanderbilt families. Kiki and her second husband, Jeromy "Gerry" Preston (1897–1934) first moved to Kenya in 1926, after being offered land on the shores of Lake Naivasha by a friend. Kiki and her husband excelled as big game hunters. Kiki was also notorious for her drug use, especially her addiction to cocaine and heroin, and was one of the best clients of Frank Greswolde Williams, the chief drug dealer of the colony. She was nicknamed "the girl with the silver syringe", due to her habit of always carrying her syringe in her bag and publicly shooting drugs without regard for onlookers. Whenever she was out of supplies, she would send an aeroplane to pick up new ones. Kiki also had numerous affairs with men, including Prince George, Duke of Kent, whom she introduced to drugs, much to the dismay of the British royal family, which forbade them from seeing each other. Kiki is often alleged to have borne a child out of wedlock from her affair with Prince George, who later became publishing executive Michael Canfield, adopted son of Cass Canfield.

Following her husband's death, Kiki gradually abandoned the farm and returned to United States. Her son, Ethan, was killed in the Normandy Landings. Kiki committed suicide in 1946, jumping out of the window of her apartment at the Stanhope Hotel in New York City.

Raymond de Trafford
Son of Sir Humphrey de Trafford, 3rd Baronet, Raymond Vincent de Trafford (1900–1971) was a British nobleman from an old Irish aristocratic family. A gambler, womaniser and alcoholic, de Trafford was a notable presence in the Happy Valley set during the 1920s, and had numerous lovers, including Alice de Janze and Kiki Preston. He once attempted to seduce Princess Alice, Duchess of Gloucester, but was repelled. De Trafford was once reported to be so drunk, he set some houses of Kenyans on fire one night.

De Trafford was threatened by his family with disinheritance if he were to marry Alice de Janze. In 1927, after discovering the truth, Alice shot him and then shot herself, while in a railway station in Paris. Raymond survived and later tried to defend Alice in her trial. In 1932, he married Alice, but almost immediately deserted her (allegedly, because he feared her) and moved to Australia. In 1939, he hit and killed a man with his car while under the influence, and spent three years in prison for manslaughter. A year later, he filed for bankruptcy.

Sir John "Jock" Delves Broughton

A British aristocrat, Sir Henry John "Jock" Delves Broughton (1883–1942) moved to Kenya, together with his new wife, Diana Caldwell, thirty years his junior. Diana immediately began a very public affair with Joss Hay, Earl of Erroll. Broughton eventually conceded to the idea of Diana deserting him and marrying Erroll, due to a prenuptial agreement they had made, that she could abandon him if she fell in love with another man.

However, Erroll was murdered in January 1941. Broughton was considered a major suspect. He was arrested by the police and tried for the murder of Erroll. Due to lack of evidence and to ballistic considerations, he was acquitted. Juanita Carberry, daughter of John Carberry (10th Baron Carbery), maintains that Broughton confessed the murder to her shortly after his acquittal. Diana quickly divorced Broughton. He returned to England, where he committed suicide by barbiturate overdose in 1942.

Diana, Lady Delamere

Born Diana Caldwell (1913–1987), she moved to the Happy Valley in late 1940, together with her new husband, Sir John "Jock" Delves Broughton, a Baronet with extensive landed estates in England. She almost immediately began a very public affair with the unofficial leader of the community, Joss Hay, Earl of Erroll. She planned to divorce Broughton and marry Erroll. Broughton supposedly gave his blessings.

Erroll was discovered murdered in his car in January 1941. Broughton was charged with his murder but was acquitted in the trial. Diana stood up for her husband, but after the trial accused him of being the murderer and abandoned him.

Following her divorce from Broughton, she married Gilbert Colvile in 1943, one of the wealthiest and most powerful landowners in Kenya and inherited much of his fortune. They adopted a daughter. In 1955, Diana married Thomas Cholmondeley, 4th Baron Delamere, and increased her land fortune. For many years in the 1960s and 1970s and until the death of her lesbian lover, Diana lived in a three-way relationship with her husband and Lady Patricia Fairweather (daughter of the 2nd Earl of Inchcape). By the time of Delamere's death, she was possibly the most powerful white woman in Africa, dubbed the "White Queen of Africa."

Leone, Cavaliere Galton-Fenzi 
Leone, Cavaliere Galton-Fenzi was the founder of the Royal East African Automobile Association, REAAA, in 1919 and honorary secretary until his death on 15 May 1937. He was the first man to drive from Nairobi to Mombasa in January 1926 in a Riley. There is a monument to this effect on Kenyatta Avenue.

In 1923, Galton Fenzi started negotiating for loan cars so that they could be tested under East African conditions. He also pioneered the Nairobi – Dar es Salaam to Malawi route, and the Nairobi-Khartoum route.

The EA Standard of 1924 quotes: ‘Galton Fenzi is always doing things, and he does them so quickly the public has no time to recover its breath!’.

Others 
Others included Gilbert Colvile, Hugh Dickenson, Jack and Nina Soames, Lady June Carberry (stepmother of Juanita Carberry), Dickie Pembroke, and Julian Lezzard. Author Karen Blixen (Isak Dinesen) was a friend of members of the group, and writer and pilot Beryl Markham frequently associated with the Happy Valley set.

See also 
 Oserian
 Mount Kenya
 Errol Trzebinski
 Whites in Kenya
 Lake Naivasha Country Club – site from the period
 Nyeri – town from the period

Sources

References 

British emigrants to Kenya
British expatriates in Kenya
European Kenyan
Irish expatriates in Kenya
History of Kenya
Immigrants to Kenya
Settlement schemes in the British Empire
1920s in Kenya
1930s in Kenya
1940s in Kenya
Settlers of Kenya
20th century in Uganda
Central Province (Kenya)
Rift Valley Province
Uganda Protectorate
 
Settlement schemes in Africa